Wilhelm Windelband (11 May 1848 – 22 October 1915) was a German philosopher of the Baden School.

Biography
Windelband was born the son of a Prussian official in Potsdam. He studied at Jena, Berlin, and Göttingen.

Philosophical work
Windelband is now mainly remembered for the terms nomothetic and idiographic, which he introduced. These have currency in psychology and other areas, though not necessarily in line with his original meanings. Windelband was a neo-Kantian who argued against other contemporary neo-Kantians, maintaining that "to understand Kant rightly means to go beyond him". Against his positivist contemporaries, Windelband argued that philosophy should engage in humanistic dialogue with the natural sciences rather than uncritically appropriating its methodologies. His interests in psychology and cultural sciences represented an opposition to psychologism and historicism schools by a critical philosophic system.

Windelband relied in his effort to reach beyond Kant on such philosophers as Georg Wilhelm Friedrich Hegel, Johann Friedrich Herbart and Hermann Lotze. Closely associated with Windelband was Heinrich Rickert. Windelband's disciples were not only noted philosophers, but sociologists like Max Weber and theologians like Ernst Troeltsch and Albert Schweitzer.

Bibliography
The following works by Windelband are available in English translations:

Books
 History of Philosophy (1893) (two volumes) reprinted 1901, 1938 and 1979 by Macmillan
 History of Ancient Philosophy (1899)
 An Introduction to Philosophy (1895) Theories in Logic (1912)

Articles
"History and Natural Science" (J. T. Lamiell, transl.).  Theory and Psychology'' 8, 1998, 6–22.

See also
Heinz Heimsoeth

References

Further reading

External links
A History of Philosophy—With especial reference to the formation and development of its problems and conceptions (1901) on archive.org
An Introduction to Philosophy on archive.org

1848 births
1915 deaths
19th-century essayists
19th-century German philosophers
20th-century essayists
20th-century German philosophers
Christian philosophers
Epistemologists
German logicians
German Lutherans
German male essayists
German male non-fiction writers
Historians of philosophy
Kantian philosophers
Metaphysicians
Ontologists
People from Potsdam
People from the Province of Brandenburg
Philosophers of logic
Philosophers of psychology
Philosophers of science